Imre Dimény (3 August 1922 – 15 March 2017) was a Hungarian agrarian engineer and Communist politician, who served as Minister of Agriculture and Food between 1967 and 1975. He was a member of the Hungarian Academy of Sciences.

Works
A gépesítés ökonómiája a mezőgazdaságban, Akadémiai Kiadó 1971, 236 p.
Mezőgazdaságunk és a műszaki fejlesztés, Kossuth Könyvkiadó,1973, 183 p.
Az állattartás gépesítésének ökonómiája, Akadémiai Kiadó, 1973,249 p.
A gépesítésfejlesztés ökonómiája a mezőgazdaságban, Akadémiai Kiadó, 1975, 507 p.
A gépesítésfejlesztés a kertészeti ágazatokban, Akadémiai Kiadó,1981, 227 p.
A kertgazdaság vállalati alapjai, Mezőgazdasági Kiadó, 1983, 262 p.
A kertgazdaság ökonómiai alapjai, Akadémiai Kiadó, 1989, 565 p.
Élelmiszergazdasági erőforrások hatékonyságának javítása, Akadémiai Kiadó, 1992, 197 p.
A vertikális kapcsolatok fejlesztésének összefüggései. In: Gazdálkodás, 1994, 5. 21-27 p.(társszerző: Rédai István)
Agrárpolitikai megfontolások és a műszaki fejlesztés, Debreceni Agrártudományi Egyetem Tiszántúli Mezőgazdasági Tudományos Napok Ökonómiai Szekció, Debrecen 1999, 3-10. p.
(Társsz.: Kovács Ferenc– Szűcs István): A mezőgazdaság szerepe a halmozottan hátrányos helyzetű térségek fejlesztésénél, MTA Agrártudományok Osztálya, Budapest, 1999. 245. p.
(Társsz.:  Széles Gyula – Szűcs István): Korszakváltások és kihívások az agrár-közgazdasági tudományokban, MTA Agrártudományok Osztályának 2001. évi Tájékoztatója, Budapest, 2001. 73–82. p.
Kozma Pál a szőlészet tudós professzora. In: Csoma Zsigmond-Balogh István Milleneumi Szőlő-boros könyv, Agroinform, Budapest, 2000. 592–599. p.
Zárszó helyett, a hazai agrárpolitika tanulságai és lehetőségei, FM-MTA Agrártudományok Osztálya, Budapest, 1998. 116–122. p. 
A mezőgazdaság sikeressége a 60-as, 70-es években. In: Nagy János – Kovács János „Személyiségek a magyar agráriumban” 79-105. p. Debrecen 2005.

References

Sources
Jávor András: A Debreceni Egyetem Agrártudományi Centrum Díszdoktorai, Debrecen 2002.  Debreceni Egyetem Agrár- és Műszaki Tudományok Centruma 
Székely Hírmondó
Budapesti Corvinus Egyetem Élelmiszertudományi Kar Élelmiszeripari Gazdaságtan Tanszék
 Z. Kiss László: Dimény Imre köszöntése 85. születésnapján In: Kertgazdaság, 2008. 40. évf. 1.	

1922 births
2017 deaths
People from Covasna County
Members of the Hungarian Socialist Workers' Party
Agriculture ministers of Hungary
Members of the Hungarian Academy of Sciences